Aydarbek is a village in the Jayyl District of Chüy Region of Kyrgyzstan. Its population was 731 in 2021.

References

Populated places in Chüy Region